Dominic Brambani (born 10 May 1985) is a former Italian international rugby league footballer who played as a  or . He played for the Castleford Tigers in the Super League and 2005's National League One. Brambani also played for Halifax, Sheffield Eagles in two separate spells, Dewsbury Rams, Batley Bulldogs and Hunslet.Dominic is now playing at cleckheaton RUFC with his hero mickey Hayward

Background
Brambani was born in Bradford, West Yorkshire, England.

Playing career
Brambani was a Great Britain Student RLFC captain when the side toured Australia in 2003. After a successful season in the Gold Coast Bycroft Cup League, Brambani was voted the Gold Coast Player of the year and won the Best Back and Top Points Scorer at his club Hinterland Storm. He also gained two representative honours, playing for the Gold Coast Vikings, and the South East Queensland Kookaburras.

Brambani has previously played for the Castleford Tigers in the Super League and Halifax. He returned to England and signed for the 2010 season at the Dewsbury Rams in the Co-operative championship.

In a recent interview, Brambani stated that signing for the Batley Bulldogs was the best decision he ever made

In November 2019, it was announced that Brambani had signed for Hunslet RLFC.

He announced his retirement at the end of the 2021 season.

References

External links
Sheffield Eagles profile
 
Italy names European Cup squad

1985 births
Living people
Batley Bulldogs players
Castleford Tigers players
Dewsbury Rams players
English expatriate rugby league players
English expatriate sportspeople in Australia
English rugby league players
Expatriate rugby league players in Australia
Featherstone Rovers players
Halifax R.L.F.C. players
Hunslet R.L.F.C. players
Italy national rugby league team players
Rugby league five-eighths
Rugby league halfbacks
Rugby league players from Bradford
Sheffield Eagles players